Malarana Chour is a village situated in the Sawai Madhopur district  of Indian state Rajasthan. It is mainly known for the Durga temple situated in the middle of village. God Meenesh temple is also situated in village aside Jaipur to Sawaimadhopur Main road.

References

Villages in Sawai Madhopur district